The 1971 Asia Golf Circuit was the tenth season of golf tournaments that comprised the Asia Golf Circuit, formerly known as the Far East Circuit. 

Hsieh Min-Nan of Taiwan won the circuit overall prize.

Schedule
The table below shows the 1971 Asia Golf Circuit schedule. There were no changes from the previous season.

Final standings
The Asia Golf Circuit standings were based on a points system.

References

Asia Golf Circuit
Asia Golf Circuit